Aivaras Baranauskas (born 6 April 1980) is a retired Lithuanian professional track cyclist. He represented his nation Lithuania as part of the men's track pursuit team at the 2004 Summer Olympics, and has also earned the men's road race title at the Lithuanian Championships in Ignalina, before turning himself into a certified pro road rider in late 2005.

Baranauskas qualified for the Lithuanian squad in the men's team pursuit at the 2004 Summer Olympics in Athens based on the nation's selection process from the UCI Track World Rankings. He delivered the Lithuanian foursome of Linas Balčiūnas, Ignatas Konovalovas, and Raimondas Vilčinskas an eighth-place time of 4:08.812 in the prelims before his team was later relegated and overlapped to an aggressive Aussie squad of Graeme Brown, Brett Lancaster, Brad McGee, and Luke Roberts in the fourth match round.

Career highlights

2001
 1st Prologue, Internatie Reningelst, Reningelst (BEL)
  European U23 Championships (Team pursuit), Fiorenzuola (ITA)
2003
 1st Stage 11, Vuelta a las Americas, Aguascalientes (MEX)
 2nd Stage 1, Ronde van Zuid-Oost Friesland, Erwetegem (NED)
 3rd Lithuanian Championships (Road), Lithuania
2004
  UCI World Cup (Team pursuit), Moscow (RUS)
 1st Stage 2, Tour of Bulgaria, Razgrad (BUL)
 2nd Stage 5, Tour of Bulgaria, Bulgaria
 3rd Lithuanian Championships (Road), Lithuania
 8th Olympic Games (Team pursuit), Athens (GRE)
2005
 1st  Lithuanian Championships (Road), Ignalina (LTU)
 1st Prologue, Grand Prix de la ville de Pérenchies, Pérenchies (FRA)
 2nd Tour du Labourd, France
 2nd Stage 4, Tour de la Province de Namur, Florennes (BEL)
 3rd Stage 4, Boucles de la Mayenne, Laval (FRA)
2006
 2nd Stage 5, 3-Länder-Tour, Frankfurt (GER)
 3rd Stage 5, Tour Méditerranéen, Hyères (FRA)
2007
 2nd Stage 3, Vuelta a Burgos, Aranda de Duero (ESP)
2008
 1st Prologue, Beuvry-la-Forêt, France

References

External links
 
 

1980 births
Living people
Lithuanian male cyclists
Lithuanian track cyclists
Cyclists at the 2004 Summer Olympics
Olympic cyclists of Lithuania
Sportspeople from Alytus